Paid is a 2006 English-language feature film directed by Laurence Lamers. It was filmed in Netherlands between 2004 and 2005 with Anne Charrier, Murilo Benício, Tom Conti, Guy Marchand, Corbin Bernsen, Marie-France Pisier, Beppe Clerici and Tygo Gernandt.

Production 
The film was particular for the Dutch film industry as it was made without public funds, privately financed and it combined a mix of nationalities, which made it an international orientated film. The actors came from France, USA, Britain, Italy, Brazil, and The Netherlands. If we look to minor extra roles, also Peru, Colombia and Venezuela.

The music was composed by the Brazilian composer Jaques Morelenbaum (Central Station) and the sound was mixed in Belgium by Alek Goosse. The film is being sold worldwide by a Swedish company called NonStop Sales.

The period between production and completing the film in post production took a while, because of availabilities of shooting. The production was planned for 25 days. After a week they had to replace the child and had to re-shoot 4 days within the 25 days. During editing there were re-shoots. One day in Brazil, Rio de Janeiro and two days in Amsterdam. The total editing period was 38 days. The final mix had to end till the end of 2005.

The production costs were 1.5 million Euros.

Premiere 
The film had its world premiere on 25 September 2006 in the Tuschinski Theatre in Amsterdam.

Music 
The music was composed by Jaques Morelenbaum, one of Brazil's most respected musicians. He arranged the music in the studio of Léo Gandelman in Rio de Janeiro, in the neighborhood of Ipanema.

His wife Paula Morelenbaum sang the end title music "Bésame Mucho".

Cast 
 Anne Charrier - Paula 
 Murilo Benício - Michel
 Tom Conti - Rudi 
 Guy Marchand - Giuseppe 
 Fendi van Brederode - Luis 
 Corbin Bernsen - William Montague 
 Tygo Gernandt - Bennie
 Hajo Bruins - Andre
 Beppe Clerici - Max 
 Helmert Woudenberg - Cor 
 Manouk van der Meulen - Anna 
 Marie-France Pisier - Gislaine 
 Ana Lúcia Torre - maid

Crew 
Director & Screenwriter: Laurence Lamers
D.O.P: Tom Erisman
Editor: Martyn Gould
Composer: Jaques Morelenbaum
Art-Director: Dimitri Merkoulov
Producer: Silvester Slavenburg
Line-Producer: Martin Lagestee
Executive Producers: Franco Sama, Jordan Yale Levine
Production Company: Slavenburg Films

Distribution 

Paramount Home Video (DVD Netherlands 2007)
Waterwood Films (Theatrical Netherlands 2007)
Vivendi Universal (DVD USA/Canada 2009)
Lightyear Entertainment (all other media USA/Canada 2009)

Festivals 
The film was shown at the following festivals:
The Dutch Festival (The Netherlands)
Mostra de São Paulo (Brazil)
Filmfest von Braunschwick (Germany)
Dereel Festival of Melbourne (Australia)
The New Orleans Film Festival (USA)
The Exground Film Festival of Wiesbaden (Germany)

References

External links

2006 films
2000s English-language films
2006 crime thriller films
Dutch crime thriller films